Bally Sports West is an American regional sports network owned by Diamond Sports Group, a joint venture between Sinclair Broadcast Group and Entertainment Studios, and operated as part of Bally Sports, along with its sister network Bally Sports SoCal. The channel broadcasts regional coverage of professional and collegiate sports events in California, focusing primarily on teams based in the Greater Los Angeles area. Bally Sports West is available on cable providers throughout Southern California, the Las Vegas Valley and Hawaii; it is also available nationwide on satellite via DirecTV.

The network holds the regional broadcast rights to the Los Angeles Angels of Major League Baseball and the Los Angeles Kings of the National Hockey League. The network also broadcast the Los Angeles Lakers of the National Basketball Association until 2012, when broadcasts moved to Spectrum SportsNet.

History

1980s
Bally Sports West was launched under the Prime Ticket name on October 19, 1985; the channel was originally co-owned by Dr. Jerry Buss, majority owner of the Los Angeles Lakers and Los Angeles Kings, and cable television pioneer Dr. Bill Daniels, who held a minority ownership interest in both franchises. Unlike many of the regional sports networks in operation at the time of Prime Ticket's launch, the channel was (and still is) structured as a basic cable channel, instead of a premium service. The network originally broadcast for seven hours a day, each evening from 5:00 p.m. to 12:00 a.m. The first contract with Prime Ticket was negotiated and signed by Tony Acone, who was appointed as president of the channel, and Bob Kerstein, chief financial officer of Falcon Cable TV. Leslie Watson, a certified public accountant employed by the accounting firm of Coopers & Lybrand, joined Prime Ticket as its first financial controller through the early years of the channel.

Prior to the launch of Prime Ticket, Los Angeles Lakers basketball and Los Angeles Kings hockey games (primarily home games that were not televised nationally) were carried within the Los Angeles market on the over-the-air subscription services ONTV and SelecTV, in addition various local TV stations. Its original general offices were located in a small office building located across the street from the Great Western Forum in Inglewood.

Prime Ticket became one of the leading regional sports networks in the United States, rivaling the New York City-based Madison Square Garden Network. The network was founded at the height of the Lakers' 1980s championship run, and also got a boost from the trade that brought Wayne Gretzky to the Kings in 1988.

In late 1988, Daniels partnered with Tele-Communications Inc. to form a new group of regional sports networks, known as the Prime Sports Network. Prime Ticket served as the flagship charter affiliate, joined by the newly formed owned-and-operated outlet Prime Sports Rocky Mountain (now AT&T SportsNet Rocky Mountain), and two networks that served as affiliates, Home Sports Entertainment (now Bally Sports Southwest) and the newly launched Sunshine Network (now Bally Sports Sun).

1990s
In 1990, Prime Ticket acquired the cable television rights to the California Angels (now the Los Angeles Angels) and the Los Angeles Clippers. The channel carried the Clippers' NBA games during the 1990-91 season, before the team struck a broadcasting agreement with SportsChannel Los Angeles (originally Z Channel) that went into effect the following season. SportsChannel Los Angeles later ceased operations in December 1992, which left the city's professional sports teams having to broadcast their locally televised games either over-the-air or in the form of select cable-exclusive telecasts for the next four years.

In 1994, the San Diego Padres came to an agreement with Prime Ticket to televise 25 home games on a new subfeed of Prime Ticket. Prime Ticket had previously been carried by cable providers in the San Diego area, but up until that point showed the same programming as Los Angeles. Prior to moving to Prime Ticket, the Padres were on the San Diego Cable Sports Network (a pay-per-view service operated by Cox Communications). The Padres would stay with Prime Ticket for only 3 seasons before returning to Cox on a basic cable service.

In August 1994, Buss and Daniels sold Prime Ticket to the Prime Network's parent company, Liberty Media, which subsequently rechristened the channel Prime Sports West. In 1996, News Corporation, which formed a sports division for the Fox network two years earlier after it obtained the broadcast rights to the National Football Conference, acquired a 50% interest in the Prime Network from Liberty Media.

On November 1, 1996, the Fox/Liberty joint venture relaunched the Prime Network affiliates as part of the new Fox Sports Net; as a result, the channel was officially rebranded as Fox Sports West. The following year, Fox Sports Net expanded to other regions with the purchase of a 40% interest in the SportsChannel networks through an asset trade with Cablevision Systems Corporation, forming the venture National Sports Partners to run the owned-and-operated regional networks.

On January 27, 1997, Fox Sports Net launched an additional channel, Fox Sports West 2 (currently Bally Sports SoCal). The in-market cable broadcasts of Los Angeles Clippers and Anaheim Ducks games moved to the new network which would also feature newly acquired rights to the Los Angeles Dodgers. UCLA and USC basketball games which were not part of Fox's Pac-10 package were also moved to Fox Sports West 2. The launch of the new network allowed Fox Sports West to focus its major league sports coverage of the Los Angeles Lakers, Los Angeles Kings and Anaheim Angels.

2000s

In 2000, Fox Sports West was rebranded as Fox Sports Net West, as part of a collective brand modification of the FSN networks under the "Fox Sports Net" banner.

In 2001, Fox Sports West and West 2 relocated their offices and studios from the Century City section of Los Angeles to Downtown, in an office building two blocks east of the Staples Center. During this time, a street-side studio for the channel's game telecasts opened at the exterior of the Staples Center, at the southwest corner of 11th (Chick Hearn Court) and South Figueroa Streets. In 2004, the channel rebranded under the shortened names FSN West, as part of Fox Sports' de-emphasis of the "Fox Sports Net" brand across its regional networks.

On April 3, 2006, FSN West 2 rebranded as FSN Prime Ticket, beginning with the Dodgers season opener against the Atlanta Braves at Dodger Stadium. The change was made to address the perception of viewers that FSN West 2 was a secondary network.  Both networks adopted a new philosophy to concentrate more on local originally-produced content (such as the documentary series Before the Bigs and In My Own Words, and team-themed Insider shows) and less on supplemental national programming provided by Fox Sports Net. FSN West reverted to the Fox Sports West moniker in 2008.

In the fall of 2009, just as rival ESPN opened its new Los Angeles-based broadcast center directly across the street at the L.A. Live complex, Fox Sports West shut down its Staples Center streetside studio. The channel began to produce its pre-game and post-game shows at the site of each televised event shown on the two networks; as weather permits, pre-game and postgame shows for most Clippers, Lakers and Kings home game are produced at Star Plaza, near the main entrance of Staples Center. The former Fox Sports Staples Center studio has since been converted into a conference center, with Nike as the corporate sponsor.

2010s
In 2012, Fox Sports West and independent station KCAL-TV (channel 9) lost the television rights to the Lakers to Time Warner Cable under a new 20-year contract, which began in the 2012-13 season with the launch of the new Time Warner Cable SportsNet. The new service also acquired the rights to air WNBA's Los Angeles Sparks and MLS's Los Angeles Galaxy games. In January 2013, TWC also signed with the Los Angeles Dodgers, establishing a new team-specific channel known as SportsNet LA.

In July 2013, News Corporation spun off the Fox Sports Networks and most of its other U.S. entertainment properties into 21st Century Fox.

On December 14, 2017, as part of a merger between both companies, The Walt Disney Company announced plans to acquire all 22 regional Fox Sports networks from 21st Century Fox, including Fox Sports West. However, on June 27, 2018, the Justice Department ordered their divestment under antitrust grounds, citing Disney's ownership of ESPN. On May 3, 2019, Sinclair Broadcast Group and Entertainment Studios (through their joint venture, Diamond Holdings) bought Fox Sports Networks from The Walt Disney Company for $10.6 billion. The deal closed on August 22, 2019.

2020s 
On November 17, 2020, Sinclair announced an agreement with casino operator Bally's Corporation to serve as a new naming rights partner for the FSN channels. Sinclair announced the new Bally Sports branding for the channels on January 27, 2021.  On March 31, 2021, coinciding with the 2021 Major League Baseball season, Fox Sports West was rebranded Bally Sports West, resulting in 18 other Regional Sports Networks renamed Bally Sports in their respective regions.

On March 14, 2023, Diamond Sports filed for Chapter 11 Bankruptcy.

Programming

Team coverage

Overflow coverage
In the Los Angeles market, in the case of scheduling conflicts, Bally Sports West will move a scheduled telecast of an Angels or Kings game to KCOP-TV (Channel 13), the local MyNetworkTV owned-and-operated station and sister station to the two networks.  Those KCOP Angels telecasts may also be streamed via the Fox Sports Go application for those outside of the Los Angeles DMA; Prior to the 2016-17 season, Kings games were not streamed on the application, as Fox Sports and the National Hockey League did not come to a streaming rights agreement until the summer of 2016.

Courtside View
Prime Ticket provided an alternate feed known as "Courtside View" during select Ducks and Kings home telecasts aired on Fox Sports West; the feature provided distinct camera angles and does not incorporate commentary, providing a broadcast simulating the experience of a spectator at the arena.

Notable on-air staff

Current

 Carrlyn Bathe — Los Angeles Kings sideline reporter (home games only)
 Daryl Evans — Kings Live analyst (road games only) 
 Alex Faust – Los Angeles Kings announcer
 Jim Fox – Los Angeles Kings commentator (former analyst for Kings "Break The Ice")
 Kent French — Angels Live host
 Mark Gubicza – Los Angeles Angels commentator and Angels Live analyst
 Nick Nickson – Fill-in Los Angeles Kings announcer (currently lead radio Play-By-Play announcer for Los Angeles Kings on iHeartRadio)
 Sean O'Donnell – Kings Live analyst (home games only)
 Patrick O'Neal – Angels Live and Kings Live host and fill-in Los Angeles Angels announcer (formerly host of Dodgers Live and Lakers Live, and Lakers sideline reporter)
 Jon Rosen — Los Angeles Kings sideline reporter (road games only)
 Wayne Randazzo – Los Angeles Angels announcer 
 Terry Smith — Fill-in Los Angeles Angels announcer
 Jarret Stoll — Kings Live analyst (home games only)
 Matt Vasgersian – Los Angeles Angels fill-in announcer
 Erica Weston – Los Angeles Angels sideline reporter
 Jeanne Zelasko — Clippers Live host

Former

 Heidi Androl – Los Angeles Kings reporter
 Michael Cage – former USC commentator and former analyst for Lakers Live and Bruins Live
 Alex Curry — Los Angeles Angels and Los Angeles Kings sideline reporter (home games only), Angels Weekly and Kings Weekly host
 Todd Donoho – Southern California Sports Report anchor
 John Fricke – Southern California Sports Report anchor
 Jack Haley – Lakers Live analyst and Big West basketball commentator
 Chick Hearn – Lakers play-by-play announcer (deceased)
 Rex Hudler – Los Angeles Angels commentator, and analyst for Angels in the Infield and Angels Live
 Carolyn Hughes – anchor of Southern California Sports Report
 Marques Johnson – Pac-12 basketball commentator and (2007) Trojans Live March Madness analyst
 Kevin Kennedy – Major League Baseball analyst
 Mark Langston – 2002 Angels postseason studio analyst
 Stu Lantz – Los Angeles Lakers commentator
 Bill Macdonald – baseball, basketball, football and hockey announcer
 Rory Markas – Angels announcer (deceased)
 José Mota – Los Angeles Angels commentator, reporter and Angels Live analyst (now reporter for the Los Angeles Dodgers on Spectrum SportsNet LA)
 Adrian Garcia Marquez – Dodgers Live reporter
 Chris McGee – Lakers Live reporter, and high school football announcer
 Marty McSorley – NHL analyst (2006)
 Joel Meyers – Los Angeles Lakers and Big 12 football announcer
 Bob Miller – Los Angeles Kings announcer, 2000 Inductee into the Hockey Hall of Fame, Recipient of the Foster Hewitt Memorial Award (retired)
 Norm Nixon – Lakers Live analyst
 Petros Papadakis – USC football analyst and Pac-12 football commentator
 Steve Physioc – Los Angeles Angels and Pac-12 basketball announcer
 Lindsay Rhodes – sideline reporter, and anchor of Trojans Live and Southern California Sports Report
 Ted Robinson – Pac-12 basketball announcer
 Victor Rojas – Los Angeles Angels announcer
 Suzy Shuster – Southern California Sports Report anchor
 Matt Stevens – UCLA football analyst
 Paul Sunderland – Pac-12, Big West and Lakers basketball announcer
 Daron Sutton – Los Angeles Angels announcer
 Barry Tompkins – Pac-12 football and basketball announcer
 Rich Waltz – Los Angeles Angels announcer
 Jim Watson – Pac-12 and LA Galaxy announcer, sideline reporter, and anchor of "Dodgers Live" and "Dodgers Dugout"
 Paul Westphal – NBA analyst, USC basketball commentator
 Van Earl Wright – anchor of Southern California Sports Report, Dodgers Dugout (2004) and Kings "Break the Ice" (2004)

Carriage issues

San Diego County

Bally Sports West maintains widespread cable carriage in San Diego County. However, the two major providers in the area, Time Warner Cable and Cox Communications, have refused to carry Prime Ticket since its launch in 1997; both cable providers claim that the network has asked for carriage fees they deemed to be too expensive for carriage on their expanded basic tiers. However, Prime Ticket was carried on some former systems that Time Warner Cable acquired in 2006 from Adelphia Communications. Adelphia had added the channel to their lineup in 2001.

On March 17, 2012, as part of a contract signed with FSN to acquire the local cable rights to the San Diego Padres, Fox Sports Networks created a separate regional network for the San Diego market, Fox Sports San Diego (now Bally Sports San Diego). Despite that channel's launch, Bally Sports West remains available on cable providers in the San Diego area; however, Bally Sports San Diego carries some programming (including most live sporting events) from Bally Sports SoCal, which essentially makes striking any carriage agreement for that channel unnecessary.

Because the San Diego Padres hold territorial rights for all of San Diego County, Los Angeles Angels games are blacked out in the county on Bally Sports West regardless of the cable or satellite provider, requiring a subscription to the MLB Extra Innings out-of-market sports package to view those telecasts. All other sports programming, with the exception of Angels baseball games carried on Bally Sports West, is available in San Diego County.

Las Vegas Valley

Bally Sports West and Bally Sports SoCal maintains widespread cable carriage in the Las Vegas Valley.
On May 23, 2017, it was announced that AT&T SportsNet had acquired the RSN rights to the Vegas Golden Knights to televise broadcast games in Southern Nevada on AT&T SportsNet Rocky Mountain which started in the 2017-2018 NHL Season.

Because the Vegas Golden Knights hold territorial rights for all of Southern Nevada, Anaheim Ducks and Los Angeles Kings games are blacked out in the Las Vegas Valley on Bally Sports West and Bally Sports SoCal regardless of the cable or satellite provider, requiring a subscription to the NHL Center Ice out-of-market sports package to view those telecasts. All other sports programming, with the exception of Ducks and Kings hockey games carried on Bally Sports West and Bally Sports SoCal, is available in Southern Nevada.

References

External links

 

Fox Sports Networks
Television stations in Los Angeles
Television channels and stations established in 1985
Companies that filed for Chapter 11 bankruptcy in 2023
Los Angeles Angels announcers
West Coast Conference
Prime Sports
1985 establishments in California
Bally Sports